Mamdouh Hosny Khalil or Mamdouh Hosni Khalil (born 7 November 1964) is an Egyptian politician.

He received a university qualification of Bachelor of Civil Engineering.
He was the chief executive officer of Alex. Steel Group which manufactured pre-engineered steel buildings, and operated a steel service center, and a sheet metal works.

As a member of the Egyptian People's Assembly he is the director of the Industry and Energy Committee.
He is also a member of the Pan African Parliament belonging to the Committee on Transport, Industry, Communications, Energy, Science and Technology
In his political affiliation with  the National Democratic Party (NDP) he is a member of Policy Committee and Energy Committee.

Personal life
His hobbies include volleyball and tennis.
He is a member of Alexandria Business Men Association, the Rotary Club of Alexandria  and the Alexandria Sporting Club.

References

1964 births
Living people
Members of the Pan-African Parliament from Egypt
Members of the House of Representatives (Egypt)
National Democratic Party (Egypt) politicians